So Many Rivers is the eleventh album by Marcia Ball, her second for Alligator Records. AllMusic's review states that "This is a standout from this queen of the gatorhythms that bring the swamp alive."

Track listing

Musicians
Marcia Ball: piano, vocals
Stephen Bruton: electric and acoustic guitar, mandolin
James Pennebaker: guitar, lap steel, baritone guitar, fiddle
Pat Boyack: guitar (tracks 4, 6, 12)
Don Bennett: bass (tracks 3, 4, 5, 6, 7, 12)
Yoggie Musgrove: bass (tracks 1, 2, 8, 14)
Chris Maresh: bass (tracks 9, 10, 11, 13)
Tom Fillman: drums
Keith Robinson: drums (track 4)
Wayne Toups: accordion and vocal (track 4)
Johnny Nicholas: harmonica (track 7)
Red Young: Hammond B3 Organ
Deborah Dobkin: percussion

Production
Produced by Stephen Bruton
Recorded at The Hit Shack, Austin, Texas
Mixed at The Austin School of Music
Engineered and mixed by Chet Himes
Assistant Engineer: Todd Dillon
Additional recording at Greenleaf Place, N. Hollywood, California
Engineered by Ross Hogarth
Track information and credits taken from the album's liner notes.

References

External links
Marcia Ball Official Site
Alligator Records Official Site

2003 albums
Marcia Ball albums
Alligator Records albums